1959 in philosophy

Events

Publications 
 Ernest Gellner, Words and Things (1959)
 C. P. Snow, The Two Cultures (1959)
 Norman O. Brown, Life Against Death (1959)
 P. F. Strawson, Individuals: An Essay in Descriptive Metaphysics (1959)
 Erving Goffman, The Presentation of Self in Everyday Life (1959)

Births 
 January 1 - Michel Onfray 
 May 20 - Konrad Ott

Deaths

References 

Philosophy
20th-century philosophy
Philosophy by year